Kamruddin Ahmed (1912-1982) was a Bangladeshi diplomat, lawyer and politician.

Early life
Ahmed was born on 8 September 1912 in Sholaghar, Sreenagar Upazila, Munshiganj District, Bengal Presidency, British India. He graduated from Barisal Zilla School in 1929 and from B. M. College in 1931. He completed his B.A. in 1934 and M.A. in 1935 from the University of Dhaka in English.

Career
Ahmed after finishing his studies joined Armanitola Government High School in Dhaka as a teacher. He was a supporter of All India Muslim League which he left after the Partition of India in 1947. In East Pakistan he joined the Sarba-daliya Rastrabhasa Sangram Parishad (All Party State Language Movement) which campaigned for Bengali language to be made a state language of Pakistan. In 1954 he joined the Awami Muslim League and was elected to the Central Committee of the Awami Muslim league in 1955. He then left politics to join the Pakistan diplomatic service. He was appointed Deputy High Commissioner of Pakistan to India based in Kolkata in 1957 and left his post in 1958. From 1958 to 1961 he was the Pakistani Ambassador to Myanmar and Combodia. In 1962 he became a lawyer. In 1971 at the start of Bangladesh Liberation war he was arrested by Pakistan Army and kept in prison till the end of the war. After the independence of Bangladesh he served as the General Secretary of Trade Union Federation. From 1976 to 1978 he was the President of the Asiatic Society of Bangladesh. He wrote a number of historical books on Bengal and Bangladesh. His son, Nizamuddin Azad, was killed in the Bangladesh Liberation war and was a member of the Mukti Bahini.

Death
Ahmed died in Dhaka on 6 February 1982.

References

Bangladeshi diplomats
1912 births
1982 deaths
Pakistani politicians